Ratu Aca Ronald Gavidi Ratuva (born 30 December 1978, in Sigatoka), better known as Aca Ratuva, is a Fijian rugby union player. He plays as a flanker or centre.

Career
Ratuva moved to Agen, in France, playing there from 2004 to 2006, and moving to Massy, the same year. Ratuva gained his first cap for Fiji on 3 June 2005, in the 27–29 loss to New Zealand Māori. 

He was a member of the Fijian squad at the 2007 Rugby World Cup finals. He played in four matches of the successful campaign of his country, that reached for the second time ever the quarter-finals, including the 20–37 final loss to South Africa. 

He currently holds 17 caps for his country, with a try scored, 5 points in total. He now plays for Nadroga back in Fiji.

External links
 Fiji profile
 Pacific Islanders profile
 Scrum profile

1978 births
Living people
Fijian rugby union players
Rugby union flankers
Fiji international rugby union players
Pacific Islanders rugby union players
Fijian expatriate rugby union players
Expatriate rugby union players in France
Fijian expatriate sportspeople in France
People from Sigatoka
I-Taukei Fijian people